The Battle of Clervaux or the Battle for Clervaux (in English sources, Clervaux is occasionally called by the German name Clerf) was an opening engagement of the Battle of the Bulge that took place in the town of Clervaux in northern Luxembourg. It lasted from December 16 to 18, 1944. German forces encircled numerically inferior American forces, primarily from the 110th Regiment and the 109th Field Artillery Battalion, and quickly forced them to surrender. The battle has been referred to as the Luxembourg "Alamo".

Clervaux was the first tank battle of the Ardennes offensive and ended in total disaster for the Americans, who permanently lost nearly 60 tanks while the Germans lost only four.

Background 
Striking at 5:30 a.m. on Saturday, 16 December, the Germans achieved almost total surprise in breaking through Allied lines, beginning what is commonly called the Battle of the Bulge. The German goal was to separate the American forces from the British and Canadian forces, and take the important port city of Antwerp.  By late afternoon the Germans had 14 divisions operating in the Ardennes, but the number would swell to an estimated 25 divisions with 600 tanks and 1,000 aircraft. The U.S. 106th Division, located in the most exposed positions along the corps line, and the 28th Division took the brunt of the attack. The 106th was later described as being "newly arrived and unpracticed", while the 28th had recently suffered heavy casualties in fighting to clear enemy forces from the Hürtgen Forest. For their part, the German forces were hampered by a lack of adequate preparatory reconnaissance. There was also a mismatch between the quality of their armored and SS formations, which fought well, and that of their regular infantry units, which consisted largely of poorly trained and poorly motivated replacements.

Prelude 
Major General Troy H. Middleton, headquartered in Bastogne, was awakened by a guard and could hear the guns from there. Throughout the day, the 106th was able to hold its position, but additional German units poured in during the night. Much of the 106th was on the German side of the Our River in an area known as the Schnee Eifel. The division's commander, Major General Alan Jones, concerned about his two regiments east of the river, called Middleton. The conversation was interrupted by another call and then resumed. At the end of the conversation Middleton told an aide that he had given his approval to have the two regiments pull back to the west side of the river. Jones, on the other hand was convinced that Middleton had directed these units to stay and was further convinced of this by a written order from earlier in the day but just received. As a result of the miscommunication, the pullback did not occur and the two regiments were ultimately surrounded with most of the men captured on 17 December. While two of the 28th Division's regiments survived the German onslaught intact, and were able to inflict significant losses on German infantry formations, the 110th Regiment, commanded by Colonel Hurley Fuller from the Claravallis hotel, was directly in the path of the massive advance.

German forces of the Fifth Panzer Army under Hasso von Manteuffel's command, primarily from the 2nd Panzer Division, 116th Panzer Division and the 126th Infantry Division (another account suggests the 2nd Panzer, Panzer Lehr Division and the 26th Volksgrenadier Division) attacked the American 110th Regiment from the 28th Division on December 16. The 110th's regimental headquarters, and most of its strength, were in the town of Clervaux. The unit also received support from a tank company from the 9th Armored Division as well from the 103rd Engineer Battalion under Captain Parrett, and 109th Field Artillery Battalion under Lt. Col. Robert E. Ewing. Despite this support, German forces had significant superiority in the region, and the engagement was described as a "couple of infantry companies and one company of light tanks versus substantial elements of an entire panzer corps." Fuller described the opposing forces as "two Panzer divisions and one infantry division." Bergström identified the U.S. defenders of Clervaux as the 110th Regimental Combat Team, 707th Tank Battalion, the 630th Tank Destroyer Battalion and a tank company from the 2nd Tank Battalion.

Battle

At 09:30 on the 17th, the 2nd Panzer Division attacked Clervaux, with six German Stug IIIs from a Panzerjäger company and Panzergrenadiers in thirty armored vehicles advancing from the south. They were repulsed by five Shermans from the 707th Tank Battalion, which knocked out two Stug IIIs, while losing three Shermans themselves. The burning vehicles blocked any further German progress along the narrow road. The Germans then detoured by attacking the northern part of the U.S. position. Their attack was a complete success as the Sherman tanks of the 2nd Tank Battalion, supported by some anti-tank guns of the 630th Tank Destroyer Battalion, were no match for two platoons of Panzer IVs from Panzer-Regiment 3. The Americans lost fourteen Shermans and most of their crews.

In the evening, a company from Panzergrenadier-Regiment 2 quickly secured the railway station and bridge north of town, capturing both objectives from the surprised Americans. Panzer IVs were radioed and they raced to the center of the town from the north, guns blazing, and most American soldiers in the town promptly surrendered. The bridge south of town was captured. Fuller requested permission to withdraw from Major General Norman Cota, the commander of the 28th Infantry Division, but was denied. Some 100 American defenders still held Clervaux Castle. Finally, on the morning of the 18th, the American troops under Captain Clark Mackey, commander of the 110th's Headquarters Company, and Captain John Aiken, out of ammunition and with the castle on fire, surrendered to the Germans as the German tanks broke into the castle compound. Some troops made it out of Clervaux but many, like Colonel Fuller, were taken prisoner before they reached the Allied lines.

Aftermath
Though the 110th Regiment and the 109th Field Artillery Battalion were shattered, the stubborn resistance offered by them and other VIII Corps units greatly slowed the German timetable. The 110th lost 2,750 men during the first days of the Ardennes battle, but how many of these were lost at Clervaux remains unknown. The 630th Tank Destroyer Battalion lost 30 out of 36 anti-tank guns on 17 December, most at Clervaux.

References

Bibliography

External links
 .
 .
 After action report 707th Tank Battalion, October thru December 44, Apr 45 thru 6 May 45.

Clervaux
1944 in Luxembourg
December 1944 events
Clervaux
Clervaux
Clervaux
Clervaux